The All-Pervading is an allegorical painting produced between 1887 and 1890 by the English artist George Frederic Watts. Influenced by the Sibyls of the Sistine Chapel ceiling, it symbolises the spirit Watts saw as governing "the immeasurable expanse". He presented it to the Tate Gallery in 1899 and it is now on loan from Tate Britain to the Watts Gallery in Compton, Guildford. He also produced a variant on it as the altarpiece for the Watts Mortuary Chapel.

External links
Tate Britain catalogue page for The All-Pervading

1890 paintings
Collection of the Tate galleries
19th-century allegorical paintings
Allegorical paintings by English artists
Paintings by George Frederic Watts